.

The Last Man or Last Man may refer to:
 The Last Man (Mary Shelley novel), an 1826 science fiction novel by Mary Shelley
 Last man, a term used by Nietzsche to describe the antithesis of the Übermensch
 The Last Man (1932 film), an American film directed by Howard Higgin
 The Last Man (1955 film), a West German film
 The Last Man (2000 film), a film starring David Arnott and Jeri Ryan
 The Last Man (2006 film), a Lebanese film
 The Last Man (2019 film), a Canadian film starring Hayden Christensen and Harvey Keitel
 "The Last Man" (Stargate Atlantis), an episode of Stargate Atlantis
 Last man (football), the last team member in a position to stop an obvious goal-scoring opportunity	
 Lastman (comic book), a French comics series

See also 
 Y: The Last Man, a comic book series by Brian K. Vaughan
 Y: The Last Man (TV series), a TV series based on the comic book series of the same name
 The Last Laugh, a landmark 1924 silent film whose original German title, Der letzte Mann, translates as "The Last Man"
 Le Dernier Homme, an 1805 French novel by Jean-Baptiste Cousin de Grainville
 The Last Woman 1976 French-Italian film
 The Last Man Who Knew Everything, a 2006 biography of Thomas Young
 Last and First Men, a 1930 science fiction novel by Olaf Stapledon
 Last Human, a 1995 novel by Doug Naylor
 To the Last Man (disambiguation)
 Last Man Standing (disambiguation)
 The Last Man on Earth (disambiguation)
 The Last One (disambiguation)
 The Last (disambiguation)
 Last (disambiguation)
 End of the world (disambiguation)
 Eschatology, theology concerning the end of humanity